To Love a Fool – A Rooftop Experience is the first live album by American contemporary worship musician Cory Asbury, and his fifth album overall. Bethel Music released the album on November 6, 2020. The album contains live renditions of songs originally released on To Love a Fool (2020). The album was produced by Paul Mabury and David Whitworth.

Background
On August 20, 2020, Asbury hosted the To Love a Fool Album Release Show, celebrating the successful release of his third studio album, To Love a Fool (2020), which had been released in late July, with Dante Bowe as the guest artist opening the event. Bethel Music premiered the concert film of the album release show on their YouTube channel on October 23, 2020. Asbury then released the album release show recordings of the songs for download and streaming on November 6, 2020.

Critical reception

Jonathan Andre in his 365 Days of Inspiring Media review gave a positive review of the album, concluding that the album is "full of wonder and awe, full of joy and heartfelt emotions as this 10 track live album (20 if you include all of the live music videos available to stream and purchase on Apple Music, alongside the audio recordings of the live album experience) showcases, verbatim, what To Love a Fool would sound like, live. Yes, these 10 tracks are the exact same as Cory's studio recording of the album in July 2020, and even though this album per se doesn't bring anything original or new to the table of Cory Asbury songs, the album nevertheless is still good, reminding me that for an artist to be great, means for them to sound just as good live as they do in the studio, and To Love a Fool — A Rooftop Experience is no exception."

Commercial performance
In the United States, To Love a Fool – A Rooftop Experience launched at No. 20 on Billboard's Top Christian Albums Chart dated November 21, 2020.

Track listing

 Songwriting credits adapted from PraiseCharts.

Charts

Release history

References

External links
 

2020 live albums
Cory Asbury albums